The Chronicon Angliae Petriburgense is a 14th-century chronicle written in Medieval Latin at Peterborough Abbey, England, covering events from 604 to 1368, although the original manuscript ends with an entry for 868, and the remainder was added in the 17th century. It survives as part of a composite manuscript volume held at the British Library with the mark Cotton Claudius A.v, in which it appears on folios 2–45. An edition of the Chronicon was published in 1723 by Joseph Sparke, in a collection of English histories by various writers. According to John Allen Giles, in the preface to his own edition published by the Caxton Society in 1845, the Chronicon was attributed by both Simon Patrick and Henry Wharton to John of Caleto (or "Caux"), who was an abbot of Peterborough (1250–1262). Giles reported a marginal note in the manuscript making a similar attribution, besides a similar note at the beginning of the manuscript stating that it belonged to Peterborough Abbey. However, Giles observed that this manuscript attribution was "comparatively modern", and regarded the chronicle's author as unknown. In Giles's view, the Chronicon is "extremely valuable both on account of the numerous facts which it contains, and for the [700 years] which it embraces."

References

Footnotes

Notes

Bibliography

14th-century history books
History of Peterborough